Kristijan Dobras (born 9 October 1992) is an Austrian footballer who plays for Liechtensteiner club FC Vaduz.

Career
After two years at Rheindorf Altach he left the club at the end of the 2018–19 season.

On 20 August 2019, ahead of the 2019–20 A-League season, Dobras joined Melbourne Victory on a one year contract.

Career statistics

Personal life

Dobras is of Croatian descent.

References

External links
 

1992 births
Living people
Association football midfielders
Austrian footballers
Austrian expatriate footballers
Austrian people of Croatian descent
Footballers from Upper Austria
People from Steyr
SK Rapid Wien players
SV Grödig players
SK Sturm Graz players
SC Wiener Neustadt players
SC Rheindorf Altach players
Melbourne Victory FC players
FC Irtysh Pavlodar players
FC Blau-Weiß Linz players
FC Vaduz players
Austrian Football Bundesliga players
2. Liga (Austria) players
Austrian Regionalliga players
Austrian expatriate sportspeople in Australia
Austrian expatriate sportspeople in Kazakhstan
Austrian expatriate sportspeople in Liechtenstein
Expatriate soccer players in Australia
Expatriate footballers in Kazakhstan
Expatriate footballers in Liechtenstein